Shastri or Shastry is a Brahmin surname. The word shastri translates to 'scholar'. It is derived from Sanskrit and means one who is proficient in the Shastras (Ancient Indian Texts). Notable people with the surname include:

Shastri
 Anant Maral Shastri (1912–1999), freedom fighter, and scholar
 Dahyabhai Shastri, Indian scholar
 Heera Lal Shastri (1899–1974), Indian politician and the first chief minister of Rajasthan state
 Keshavram Kashiram Shastri (1905–2006), founding leader of Vishwa Hindu Parishad
 Lal Bahadur Shastri (1904–1966), second Prime Minister of the Republic of India
 Narayani Shastri (born 1968), television and theatre actress
 Pandurang Shastri Athavale (1920–2003), Indian philosopher also known as Dada-ji
 Prakash Vir Shastri (1923–1977), noted Member of the Parliament of India (Sansad)
 Rajaram Shastri (1904–1991)
 Ram Nath Shastri (1914–2009), Dogri poet, Sahitya Akademi Fellow
 Ram Shastri (died 1772), Chief Justice in the apex court of the Maratha Empire
 Ratan Shastri (died 1998)
 Ravi Shastri (born 1962), former Indian Test cricketer
 Satya Vrat Shastri (born 1930), Sanskrit scholar
 Shukraraj Shastri (1894–1941), pre-eminent Nepalese intellectual
 Shyama Shastri (1762–1827), Renowned composers of Carnatic music and oldest among the Trinity of Carnatic music
 Sirivennala Sitarama Shastri (born 1955), Telugu and Sanskrit Poet
 Vagish Shastri (born 1934), Sanskrit Grammarian, who discovered a short cut way of learning Sanskrit
 Vishnu Kant Shastri (1929–2005), Indian politician who served as the governor of Uttar Pradesh and Himachal Pradesh

Shastry 
 Anant Krishna Shastry (born 1940), Indian historian
 Archana Shastry, Indian film actress
 B. Sriram Shastry (born 1950), Indian-American physicist
 Chamu Krishna Shastry (born 1956), Indian language activist
 H. Ramachandra Shastry (1906–1992), Indian Carnatic flautist
 Kala Nath Shastry (born 1936), Indologist, writer, and linguist
 Su. Rudramurthy Shastry (born 1984), Indian novelist
 Vinayak Shastry (born 1978), Cannabis Entrepreneur

See also
 
 Sastri
 Sastry
 Shastra